The 2017–18  Linafoot season is the 57th since its establishment. Linafoot is the top-flight association football league of DR Congo in Africa. The season started on 11 November 2017 and ended on 14 July 2018.

First round
There are three regional divisions with 8 to 10 teams. Advancing are top 3 from East, top 4 from West, top 4 from Center-South, and the best 5th-placed team from West or Center-South.

Zone de développement Est

Zone de développement Ouest

Zone de développement Centre Sud

Final round
A total of 12 teams participate in the final round.
Zone de développement Est:        AS Maniema Union (Kindu), FC Mont Bleu (Bunia), AS Dauphin Noir (Goma)
Zone de développement Ouest:      DC Motema Pembe (Kinshasa), AS Vita Club (Kinshasa), Académic Club Rangers (Kinshasa), AS Dragons/Bilima (Kinshasa) 
Zone de développement Centre-Sud: TP Mazembe (Lubumbashi), FC Saint-Eloi Lupopo (Lubumbashi), SM Sanga Balende (Mbuji-Mayi), CS Don Bosco (Lubumbashi), JS Groupe Bazano (Lubumbashi) [as best 5th placed team]

Top scorers

See also
2018 Coupe du Congo

References

External links

Linafoot seasons
Congo DR
football
football